Lanfia Camara (born 3 October 1986) is a Guinean football defender who plays in Belgium for FC Ganshoren.

Career
Born in Conakry, Camara moved to Belgium at age 18. He had played in Guinea's youth national teams, but began playing in the Belgian provincial leagues with Tempo Overijse. Eventually, he joined Brussels side White Star Woluwe F.C. and helped them gain promotion to the Belgian Second Division.  In the summer of 2013, he signed for local rivals and fellow Second Division side FC Brussels. Since August 2014 he plays for Belgian second division club  KRC Mechelen

References

External links
 
 MTN Football profile
 FootballDatabase.eu profile

1986 births
Living people
Guinean footballers
Guinean expatriate footballers
Guinea international footballers
RWS Bruxelles players
R.W.D.M. Brussels F.C. players
K.R.C. Mechelen players
K. Patro Eisden Maasmechelen players
Association football midfielders
Association football defenders
Guinean expatriate sportspeople in Belgium
Expatriate footballers in Belgium